Iruthayanathan Charles Nirmalanathan (born 24 November 1975) is a Sri Lankan Tamil politician and Member of Parliament.

Early life
Nirmalanathan was born on 24 November 1975. He was educated at Velautham Maha Vidyalayam in Point Pedro.

Career
Nirmalanathan is president of the Vavuniya Citizens Committee. He is a member of the Illankai Tamil Arasu Kachchi.

Nirmalanathan contested the 2013 provincial council election one of the Tamil National Alliance (TNA) electoral alliance's candidates in Mannar District but failed to get elected after coming 4th amongst the TNA candidates. He contested the 2015 parliamentary election as one of the TNA's candidates in Vanni District and was elected to the Parliament of Sri Lanka. He was re-elected at the 2020 parliamentary election.

Electoral history

References

1975 births
Illankai Tamil Arasu Kachchi politicians
Living people
Members of the 15th Parliament of Sri Lanka
Members of the 16th Parliament of Sri Lanka
People from Northern Province, Sri Lanka
Sri Lankan Roman Catholics
Sri Lankan Tamil politicians
Tamil National Alliance politicians